Isola d'Arbia is a village in Tuscany, central Italy, administratively a frazione of the comune of Siena, province of Siena. At the time of the 2001 census its population was 909.

Isola d'Arbia is about 10 km from Siena.

References 

Frazioni of Siena